Mountainburg is a town in Crawford County, Arkansas, United States. It is part of the Fort Smith, Arkansas-Oklahoma Metropolitan Statistical Area. As of the 2010 census the population was 631.

Mountainburg was laid out in 1883 when the St. Louis–San Francisco Railway was extended to that point.

Geography

Mountainburg is located along U.S. Route 71, and thrived when this road was the main route in northwest Arkansas. Since the construction of Interstate 540 (now Interstate 49) to the west, it has been a sleepier community. The city park in downtown Mountainburg has since 1980 hosted two large dinosaur models.

Demographics

2020 census

As of the 2020 United States census, there were 528 people, 252 households, and 136 families residing in the city.

2000 census
At the 2000 census there were 682 people in 271 households, including 179 families, in the city. The racial makeup of the city was 95.45% White, 0.15% Black or African American, 3.08% Native American, 0.15% Pacific Islander, 0.59% from other races, and 0.59% from two or more races. 0.59% of the population were Hispanic or Latino of any race.
Of the 271 households 35.8% had children under the age of 18 living with them, 52.0% were married couples living together, 10.7% had a female householder with no husband present, and 33.6% were non-families. 30.6% of households were one person and 16.2% were one person aged 65 or older. The average household size was 2.52 and the average family size was 3.15.

The age distribution was 29.2% under the age of 18, 8.2% from 18 to 24, 26.4% from 25 to 44, 20.8% from 45 to 64, and 15.4% 65 or older. The median age was 34 years. For every 100 females, there were 97.1 males. For every 100 females age 18 and over, there were 89.4 males.

The median household income was $25,446 and the median family income  was $33,295. Males had a median income of $24,375 versus $21,806 for females. The per capita income for the city was $14,445. About 12.0% of families and 17.3% of the population were below the poverty line, including 22.2% of those under age 18 and 20.1% of those age 65 or over.

Notable person
 Jim Clark - bank robber and Depression-era outlaw

Climate
The climate in this area is characterized by hot, humid summers and generally mild to cool winters. According to the Köppen Climate Classification system, Mountainburg has a humid subtropical climate, abbreviated "Cfa" on climate maps.

References

External links
Mountainburg Schools, public school district

Cities in Crawford County, Arkansas
Cities in Arkansas
Fort Smith metropolitan area